Asterix Conquers America (in France as Astérix et les Indiens; in Germany as Asterix in Amerika) is a 1994 German animated film, directed by , and co-produced by Hahn and . The film is a loose adaptation of the Asterix graphic novel, Asterix and the Great Crossing, and the second film adaptation to be produced outside France. It is also the first Asterix movie to be made in English. The plot focuses on Asterix and Obelix seeking to rescue Getafix, who is transported to North America by the Romans, before their village runs out of magic potion to defend themselves.

The film was mainly made for the direct-to-video market, and distributed in Germany by Jugendfilm, with 20th Century Fox handling its distribution in France, Spain and the United Kingdom.

Plot
After the rebel village of Gauls defeat another Roman army, a humiliated Julius Caesar angrily devises a plan to cut them off from the magic potion that gives them super-human strength. Caesar's most loyal patrician, Lucullus, finds himself instructed to kidnap the druid Getafix and send him off the edge of the world. Meanwhile in Gaul, a freak accident during a fight amongst the villagers accidentally spills a cauldron of potion Getafix was making. Although there is a small amount left, Getafix is forced to locate ingredients to make more, with Dogmatix accompanying him. Taking advantage of this, Lucullus pretends to be a druid in order to entrap both. While fishing for fresh fish, Asterix and Obelix spot the pair being taken away across the Atlantic Ocean on a Roman galley, and pursue after them.

Despite losing the galley in a storm, a dolphin helps the pair track it down, after reuniting them with Dogmatix after he was thrown overboard. Upon arriving at the eastern coastline of North America, which they mistake as the world's edge, the Romans catapult Getafix ashore. Lucullus becomes delighted when Asterix, Obelix and Dogmatix crash on the shoreline, and soon returns home to inform Caesar of the good news. When the pair discover where they are, Asterix and Obelix begin exploring North America, before camping for the night while enjoying meal of the indigenous turkeys. The following morning, Asterix is captured by a tribe of Native Americans and taken to their village. He quickly finds himself tied to a pole alongside Getafix, who reveals that the Romans catapulted him onto the hut of the tribe's medicine man, alongside his observation that the world is round rather than flat.

When Obelix, who had gone off hunting, discovers his friend missing, he soon begins searching for him. In the process, he finds himself rescuing Minihooha, the daughter of the tribe's chief, from a stampede of bison. Brought to her village, Obelix soon impresses the chief with his strength, leading to Asterix and Getafix being freed. That night, the group join in with the tribe's evening customs. Getafix quickly humiliates the medicine man in front of the tribe with his magic, and gives Minihooha some magic potion so she can punish him for getting her wet with a cheap trick. Angered, the medicine man visits the group in their tent on the pretense of offering peace, only to knock them out with hallucinogens in a pipe, kidnapping Getafix. The next day, Obelix awakes in a drug-induced amnesia, leaving Asterix to seek out Getafix on his own. He quickly finds and rescues him from the medicine man, who had tried to force him to give up the magic potion's recipe.

After Minihooha cures Obelix of his condition, the group say farewell to the tribe and make their way back to Gaul. Upon returning home, the group find that the Romans overwhelmed the village, after they ran out of magic potion. Finding all but Cacofonix were captured and are set to be taken to Rome by Caesar and Lucullus, Getafix brews the magic potion, and gives Asterix and Obelix two phials for the villagers. Sneaking into a Roman camp disguised as Roman soldiers, the pair supply their fellow Gauls with the potion, whereupon they proceed to trash the camp. Lucullus is eaten by Caesar's pet panther, while Caesar himself discreetly escapes and returns home. As the villagers hold a celebratory feast, the group listen to Obelix tell them of his new adventure, before teaching them the song that the Native American tribe sung during their stay.

Cast

References

External links
 

1994 films
1994 animated films
1990s French animated films
Asterix films
Films set in pre-Columbian America
French animated films
German animated films
French children's films
German children's films
Animated films based on comics
Films scored by Harold Faltermeyer
20th Century Fox films
20th Century Fox animated films
1990s children's animated films
Films with screenplays by Pierre Tchernia
1990s American films
1990s French films
1990s German films